Liberalism is a Sin (Spanish: El liberalismo es pecado) is a controversial book written by Roman Catholic priest Félix Sardà y Salvany in 1884, which became a rallying point for conservative political movements such as Integrism and Carlism.

The book
Salvany believed that liberalism is the "burning issue of our century" : it is the "radical and absolute negation of the sovereignty of God". It is all the more dangerous because it became an official legal error, introduced into the government of princes by powerful figures.

The pamphlet was written in a period that was favourable to anti-liberalism and Catholic integralism in the history of Spain: the First Spanish Republic had been overthrown in 1874 and the Bourbon dynasty had been restored to the throne. The writing had considerable success among the Carlist and Integrist movements.

Salvany drew heavily from the papal encyclicals Traditi humilitati of Pope Pius VIII (1829), Mirari vos of Pope Gregory XVI (1832) and Quanta cura of Pope Pius IX (1864, uncluding the attached Syllabus Errorum).

Controversies about the book
Under the direction of liberal-leaning Bishop Rev. Jacobo Catala Et Alboso, a rebuttal to Salvany's El liberalismo es pecado was written by the Catholic canon Celestino de Pazos from Vich entitled El proceso del integrismo: refutación de los errores que contiene el opúsculo del Dr. Sardá y Salvany "el liberalismo es pecado". Both works were sent to the Sacred Congregation of the Index and its secretary, Fr. Jerome Secheri , issued a statement on January 10, 1887, ruling for Salvany and finding errors in the rebuttal along with uncharitable insinuations about Salvany. 

Historian Noel Valis points out that "During the Spanish Civil War, in a propaganda pamphlet, the Republican supporter Langdon-Davies pointed out to English Catholics that the same sentiment (liberalism is a sin) could be found in a popular catechism by Angel Maria de Arcos."

Versions
A translation of Salvany's El liberalismo es pecado into English was created by Condé B. Pallen, entitled What Is Liberalism?. The translation was first published in 1899 and reprinted many times including in 1979 and 1989.

References

External links
 Liberalism is a Sin (Text)

Books in political philosophy
Books about liberalism
Catholicism and politics